Solband was a village in Balochistan, Pakistan, which was destroyed during the 2007 South Asian floods.

References

Destroyed cities
Populated places disestablished in 2007
Populated places in Kech District